The Mission Inn Resort and Club Championship is a tournament on the Epson Tour, the LPGA's developmental tour. It has been a part of the tour's schedule since 2020. It is held at Mission Inn Resort & Club in Howey-in-the-Hills, Florida.

Tournament names through the years:
2020-2021 Mission Inn Resort and Club Championship
2022 Inova Mission Inn Resort and Club Championship

Winners

References

External links

 Coverage on Epson Tour website

Symetra Tour events
Golf in Florida
Recurring sporting events established in 2020
2020 establishments in Florida